Sanai Choughade is a Marathi movie released on 20 June 2008. Produced by Deepti Shreyas Talpade and directed by Rajeev Patil.

Cast 

Shreyas Talpade as Aniket.
Subodh Bhave as Rahul Borgavkar.
Sai Tamhankar as Saee.
Santosh Juvekar as Aditya.
Shilpa Tulaskar as Saee' sister.
Tushar Dalvi as Jijaji Shrikant.
Bharti Achrekar.
Chinmay Mandlekar as Amit.
Anita Date-Kelkar as Seema.
Dipti Ketkar as Ananya.
Vidyadhar Joshi as Dada; Amit's father.
Meghana Erande as Ketaki.
Shruti Marathe as Ashwini.

Soundtrack
The music is provided by Avadhoot Gupte.

Track listing

References

External links 
  Mukta Arts' KAANDE POHE is now SANAI CHOUGHADE – glamsham.com
 Movie Review – gomolo.com

2008 films
2000s Marathi-language films